Statistics of Swedish football Division 1 in season 1994.

Overview
It was contested by 28 teams, and Djurgårdens IF and Örgryte IS won the championship.

League standings

Norra

Södra

Footnotes

References
Sweden - List of final tables (Clas Glenning)

1994
2
Sweden
Sweden